Przedmoście may refer to:

Przedmoście, Głogów County, in Lower Silesian Voivodeship (SW Poland)
Przedmoście, Środa Śląska County, in Lower Silesian Voivodeship (SW Poland)